Events in the year 1945 in Bulgaria.

Incumbents 
Monarch – Simeon II
Regency council

Events 

 18 November – Parliamentary elections were held in Bulgaria.
 21 July – The University of Ruse was founded.

References 

 
1940s in Bulgaria
Years of the 20th century in Bulgaria
Bulgaria
Bulgaria